Bobby Bowsher (born October 5, 1966) is an American former professional racing driver. He is a two-time ARCA Racing Series champion, winning the title in 1992, and again in 1994. He is the son of 1963, 1964, and 1965 ARCA Racing Series champion Jack Bowsher, and the brother of fellow ARCA competitor Todd Bowsher.

Racing career
Bowsher first made his ARCA Permatex SuperCar Series in 1988 driving the No. 01 Ford at Kil-Kare Raceway driving father Jack's family owned team, finishing 21st after starting 22nd. He would make 10 more starts and earn two top tens with a ninth at Pocono Raceway, and a fifth at Salem Speedway.

Bowsher would run his first full season in ARCA the following year in 1989, driving the No. 01 Ford for his fathers team, and he would fourth overall in the series standings that year with eight top-10's, including two top-5's at Talladega Superspeedway, where he would finish fifth, and at Salem, where he would finish third. In 1990, now in the No. 21, he would win his first ARCA race at Flat Rock Speedway after leading the 116 out of 150 laps. He would win again at Kil-Kare and would get seven more top-10's to finish third in the points. In 1991, he would win four races, tying with Bob Keselowski with the most wins in the year. He would also win his first career pole at Flat Rock, a race he would later win. He would finish runner-up in the standings behind Bill Venturini.

In 1992, Bowsher would start the season, finishing in second place at the season opener at Daytona International Speedway. He would then finish in the top 10 in fifteen times in the next twenty races, including back-to-back wins late in the season at the Illinois State Fairgrounds Racetrack and Toledo Speedway on his way to his first ARCA series title ahead of Bob Keselowski. In the following year, he would win one race at Toledo and earn twelve top-10's to finish third in the standings behind Keselowski and eventual champion Tim Steele.

In 1994, Bowsher would start out the year with seven straight top-10's, including a win at Louisville Motor Speedway, which ended at Michigan Speedway, where he would finish 22nd. He would then have a streak of ten straight top-10's, including two wins at Kil-Kare and Toledo to win his second title ahead of future series champion Frank Kimmel. In the following year in 1995, he would win two races during the year, including Shady Bowl Speedway, where he would lead every lap, and would finish second in the standings behind Andy Hillenburg. In 1996, he would start the season on a low note finishing 40th at Daytona, but would win the pole in three of the next five races, including at Louisville, where he would win the event. He would earn his final two wins at Shady Bowl Speedway, and Kil-Kare, and would once again finish second in the standings behind Tim Steele. This would end up being his final full-time season in ARCA.

During his time away from ARCA from 1997 to 2002, he would run three races in the ASA National Tour in 2001, getting a best result of 18th at Memphis International Raceway and Winchester Speedway.

After a five year hiatus, Bowsher would return to the now ARCA Re/Max Series, returning to his family team driving the No. 55 Ford at Talladega as a teammate to his brother Todd. After starting 41st and last, he would go on to finish 25th in the race, albeit nine laps down. He would run three races in the following year, mainly serving as a start and park entry with a best finish of 32nd at Kansas Speedway. In 2004, Bowsher would run eight more races, finishing only two of those races, including his final top ten at Springfield with a seventh place result. This would be his final season in ARCA competition as he did not race since then.

Personal life
Bowsher is married and has a daughter named Brittany.

Motorsports results

ARCA Re/Max Series
(key) (Bold – Pole position awarded by qualifying time. Italics – Pole position earned by points standings or practice time. * – Most laps led. ** – All laps led.)

References

1966 births
Living people
NASCAR drivers
ARCA Menards Series drivers
Racing drivers from Ohio
Sportspeople from Springfield, Ohio